From Dusk till Dawn is a 1996 American action horror film directed by Robert Rodriguez and written by Quentin Tarantino from a concept and story by Robert Kurtzman. Starring Harvey Keitel, George Clooney, Quentin Tarantino, Ernest Liu, and Juliette Lewis, the plot follows a pair of American criminal brothers (Clooney and Tarantino) who take a family as hostages (Keitel, Liu, and Lewis) in order to cross into Mexico, but ultimately find themselves trapped in a saloon frequented by vampires.

The film was released on January 17, 1996, and received mixed reviews from critics, who described the film as well-made if overly violent. After enjoying financial success at the box office, From Dusk till Dawn has since become a cult film and spawned a media franchise of sequel films, a video game and other media adaptations.

Plot
Fugitive bank robber brothers Seth and Richie Gecko hold up a liquor store, killing clerk Pete Bottoms and Texas Ranger Earl McGraw in a shootout. They inadvertently destroy the building as they leave. At an inn room where they are hiding out, Seth returns from getting food to find Richie has raped and murdered a bank clerk they had taken hostage, much to his anger.

Jacob Fuller, a pastor experiencing a crisis of faith brought on by the death of his wife, is on vacation with his teenage children Scott and Kate in their RV. They stop at the inn and are kidnapped by the Gecko brothers, who force the Fuller family to smuggle them over the Mexican border. In Mexico, they arrive at the Titty Twister, a strip club in the desert, where the Gecko brothers will be met by their contact, Carlos, at dawn. Carlos will escort them to the sanctuary at "El Rey", a place of safety for fugitives from justice whose admission fee is 30 percent of everything they have. When Richie complains to Seth that this is too high, Seth tells him it is non-negotiable.

During a bar fight, the bar employees reveal themselves as vampires and kill most of the patrons. Richie is bitten by a stripper, Santanico Pandemonium, and dies, but Seth manages to kill her by shooting at a chandelier above her that impales her. Only Seth, Jacob, Kate, Scott, a biker named Sex Machine, and Frost—a Vietnam War veteran—survive. The others are reborn as vampires, including Richie, forcing the survivors to kill them all. When an army of vampires, in bat form, assembles outside, the survivors lock themselves inside, but Sex Machine is bitten, becomes a vampire, and bites Frost and Jacob. Frost throws Sex Machine through the door, allowing the vampires to enter while Frost turns into a vampire.

Seth, Kate, and Scott escape to a storeroom, followed shortly by an injured but still alive Jacob, brandishing a shotgun. In the storeroom, they fashion weapons from truck cargo the vampires have looted from past victims, including a stake mounted on a pneumatic drill, a crossbow, and holy water, which requires Jacob to recover his faith to bless. Jacob, knowing he will soon become a vampire, makes Scott and Kate promise to kill him when he changes.

The group makes their final assault on the undead. Sex Machine mutates into a large rat-like creature and attacks Seth, but is killed. Jacob becomes a vampire but Scott hesitates to kill him, allowing Jacob to bite him. Scott kills him, but then is overwhelmed by vampires, who begin to devour him; he begs for death, and Kate kills him. As vampires surround Kate and Seth, streams of morning light enter through bullet holes in the building, making the vampires back away. Carlos arrives and his bodyguards blast open the door, letting in the sunlight which kills the vampires.

Seth chastises Carlos for his poor choice of meeting place and negotiates a smaller tribute for his admission to El Rey. Kate asks Seth if he wants her to go with him to El Rey, but he refuses, apparently concerned for her safety, leaving her with some cash. Kate drives away in the RV, leaving the Titty Twister behind, which is revealed to be the top of an eight-level partially buried Aztec temple.

Cast

Harvey Keitel as Jacob Fuller
 George Clooney as Seth Gecko
Quentin Tarantino as Richard "Richie" Gecko
Juliette Lewis as Katherine "Kate" Fuller
Ernest Liu as Scott Fuller
Salma Hayek as Santanico Pandemonium
Brenda Hillhouse as Hostage Gloria Hill
Marc Lawrence as Old Timer Motel Owner
Cheech Marin as Border Guard / Chet Pussy / Carlos
Michael Parks as Texas Ranger Earl McGraw
Kelly Preston as Newscaster Kelly Houge
Tom Savini as Sex Machine
John Saxon as FBI Agent Stanley Chase
Danny Trejo as Razor Charlie
Fred Williamson as Frost
John Hawkes as Pete Bottoms
Tito & Tarantula as The Titty Twister House Band
Special make-up effects creator Greg Nicotero appears as Sex Machine's buddy.

Development
From Dusk till Dawn was conceived by Robert Kurtzman, who hired Tarantino to write the script as his first paid writing assignment. Universal Pictures originally considered Tarantino's screenplay for From Dusk till Dawn as the follow-up to Demon Knight and the second in a proposed Tales from the Crypt film trilogy, but ultimately produced another vampire film, Bordello of Blood, instead.

Production

References to other titles
The "El Rey" hideout in Mexico was borrowed from The Getaway, a 1958 crime novel by Jim Thompson.

Earl McGraw became a recurring character in Rodriguez and Tarantino's works, later appearing in Kill Bill, Planet Terror and Death Proof, appearing as an Easter Egg. Chango Beer and Sex Machine's codpiece gun are references to Rodriguez's 1995 film Desperado. Seth also returns to the hotel with Big Kahuna Burgers, which were used in Pulp Fiction and mentioned in Death Proof. Seth Gecko also says the line "All right, Ramblers. Let's get ramblin'!", a quote from Tarantino's  Reservoir Dogs. Scott's T-shirt decoration reads "Precinct 13", a reference to John Carpenter's 1976 film, Assault on Precinct 13.

Non-union crew
As with many of Rodriguez's films, From Dusk till Dawn employed a non-union production crew, which is unusual for a production with a budget above $15 million.

Release
From Dusk till Dawn had its world premiere on January 17, 1996. On its first week, the film grossed $10,240,805 in the United States making it the highest-grossing film of the week. The next week, the film fell to third highest in the box office where it grossed $4,851,921 being beaten by Mr. Holland's Opus and Bed of Roses. From Dusk till Dawn grossed $25,836,616 in the United States and $33,500,000 internationally, for a worldwide gross of $59,336,616.

On May 1, 1996, the film was banned in Ireland; Irish Film Censor Board head Sheamus Smith cited its "irresponsible and totally gratuitous" violence, which he felt was particularly untimely in the wake of the then-recent Dunblane and Port Arthur massacres. On January 27, 2004, the video release was passed with an 18 certificate.

Reception
  Audiences polled by CinemaScore gave the film an average grade of "B−" on an A+ to F scale.

Roger Ebert gave the film three out of four stars and described it as "a skillful meat-and-potatoes action extravaganza with some added neat touches". In her review for The New York Times, Janet Maslin wrote: "The latter part of From Dusk till Dawn is so relentless that it's as if a spigot has been turned on and then broken. Though some of the tricks are entertainingly staged, the film loses its clever edge when its action heats up so gruesomely and exploitatively that there's no time for talk". Entertainment Weekly gave the film a "B" rating and Owen Gleiberman wrote: "Rodriguez and Tarantino have taken the let-'em-eat-trash cynicism of modern corporate moviemaking and repackaged it as junk-conscious 'attitude'. In From Dusk till Dawn, they put on such a show of cooking up popcorn that they make pandering to the audience seem hip". However, in his review for The Washington Post, Desson Howe wrote: "The movie, which treats you with contempt for even watching it, is a monument to its own lack of imagination. It's a triumph of vile over content; mindless nihilism posing as hipness". Cinefantastique magazine's Steve Biodrowski wrote: "Whereas one might reasonably have expected that the combo of Quentin Tarantino and Robert Rodriguez would yield a critical mass of nuclear proportions, instead of an atomic fireball's worth of entertainment, we get a long fuse, quite a bit of fizzle, and a rather minor blast". In his review for the San Francisco Chronicle, Mick LaSalle called the film "an ugly, unpleasant criminals-on-the-lam film that midway turns into a boring and completely repellent vampire 'comedy'. If it's not one of the worst films of 1996 it will have been one miserable year". In Marc Savlov's review for the Austin Chronicle, he wrote: "Fans of Merchant Ivory will do well to steer clear of Rodriguez's newest opus, but both action and horror film fans have cause for celebration after what seems like a particularly long splatter-drought. This is horror with a wink and a nod to drive-in theatres and sweaty back seats. This is how it's done".

Awards and nominations

Soundtrack

The soundtrack features mainly Texas blues by such artists as ZZ Top and brothers Stevie Ray and Jimmie Vaughan on separate tracks. The Chicano rock band Tito & Tarantula, who portrayed the band in the Titty Twister, appears on the soundtrack as well. The film's score is by Graeme Revell. "Dark Night" by The Blasters plays over the film's opening and closing credits.

Video game

A video game of the same name was released for Windows in 2001. It is based on events that transpire directly after the end of the film.

Sequel and prequel

From Dusk till Dawn was followed by two direct-to-video installments, a sequel From Dusk Till Dawn 2: Texas Blood Money (1999) and prequel From Dusk Till Dawn 3: The Hangman's Daughter (2000). They were both received poorly by critics. Danny Trejo is the only actor to appear in all three, although Michael Parks appears in both From Dusk till Dawn and The Hangman's Daughter. Rodriguez, Tarantino and Lawrence Bender served as producers on all three movies.

Television

A television series inspired by the films premiered on the El Rey network in March 2014, produced and directed by Rodriguez. The show was intended to explore and expand on the characters and story from the film, providing a wider scope and richer Aztec mythology.

The series ended production in 2016 with Deadline Hollywood reporting that the actors have been released from their contracts as of October 31.

References

External links

 
 
 
 
 
 

1996 films
1996 horror films
1996 action comedy films
1990s monster movies
American action comedy films
American action horror films
American comedy horror films
American monster movies
1990s English-language films
1990s Spanish-language films
American vampire films
From Dusk till Dawn (franchise)
A Band Apart films
Miramax films
Dimension Films films
Troublemaker Studios films
Films about kidnapping in the United States
Films about brothers
Films about dysfunctional families
Films about murderers
Films about the Texas Ranger Division
Films about widowhood
Films set in Mexico
Films set in Texas
Films shot in California
Films about rape
Films with screenplays by Quentin Tarantino
Films scored by Graeme Revell
Films directed by Robert Rodriguez
Films produced by Elizabeth Avellán
Films adapted into comics
1996 comedy films
Censored films
American exploitation films
American splatter films
1990s American films